Cornelis Willem Opzoomer (20 September 1821, Rotterdam – 23 August 1892, Oosterbeek) was a Dutch jurist, positivist philosopher and theologian. He was professor of philosophy at Utrecht University from 1846 to 1889.

In 1856 he became member of the Royal Netherlands Academy of Arts and Sciences.

References

External links
Short biography at the Dutch National Library site.

1821 births
1892 deaths
19th-century Dutch philosophers
Dutch jurists
Members of the Royal Netherlands Academy of Arts and Sciences
Writers from Rotterdam
Leiden University alumni
Academic staff of Utrecht University